Razyaryonny was one of 29 s (officially known as Project 7) built for the Soviet Navy during the late 1930s. Originally named Peredovoy, she was renamed Razyaryonny before completion in late 1941, and was assigned to the Pacific Fleet.

About a year after the German invasion of Russia in June 1941, she was ordered to join the Northern Fleet, sailing through the Arctic Ocean. Together with several other destroyers, Razyaryonny left the Soviet Far East in July 1942 and arrived off Murmansk three months later, suffering a bent propeller shaft that during the journey that kept her under repair until January 1943. Just days after becoming operational, she ran aground and was under repair until June. Escorting convoys from mid-1943, the destroyer was torpedoed by a German submarine in January 1945, losing her stern. Razyaryonny was repaired postwar using a stern salvaged from a sunken sister ship and served until the late 1950s, when she was sunk during a nuclear test.

Design and description
Having decided to build the large and expensive   destroyer leaders, the Soviet Navy sought Italian assistance in designing smaller and cheaper destroyers.

Their crew numbered 197 officers and sailors in peacetime and 236 in wartime. The designers had been conservative in rating the turbines and many, but not all, of the ships handily exceeded their designed speed during their sea trials. Like her sisters with the Northern Fleet, Razyaryonny reached 37 knots in 1943.

As built, the Gnevny-class ships mounted four  B-13 guns, protected by gun shields, in two pairs of superfiring single mounts fore and aft of the superstructure. Anti-aircraft defense was provided by a pair of  34-K anti-aircraft (AA) guns in single mounts and a pair of  21-K AA guns as well as two  DK or DShK machine guns. They carried six  torpedo tubes in two rotating triple mounts amidships; each tube was provided with a reload. The ships could also carry a maximum of either 60 or 95 mines and 25 depth charges. The ships were equipped with two K-1 paravanes intended to destroy mines and a pair of depth-charge throwers.

Construction and service 
Major components for the ship that became Razyaryonny were laid down at Shipyard No. 198 (Andre Marti South) in Nikolayev on 15 September 1936 as yard number 326 and were then railed to Shipyard No. 199 at Komsomolsk-on-Amur in the Russian Far East, for completion where the ship was laid down again on 17 September 1937 as Peredovoy. She was renamed Razvitoy on 25 September 1940 and was launched on 22 May 1941 after being renamed Razyaryonny on 16 May. The ship was completed on 27 November and joined the Pacific Fleet on 14 December 1941.

As a result of the weakness of the Northern Fleet and the importance of the Arctic convoys of World War II, Stavka decided to transfer several modern ships from the Pacific to the Northern Fleet in May 1942; this was ordered by People's Commissar of the Navy Admiral Nikolay Kuznetsov on 18 June. Razyaryonny had her hull strengthened against ice during June and July, departing Vladivostok with EON-18 on 15 July. While in Providence Bay on 30 July, one of her screws grounded, severely damaging its blades. It was replaced by a spare from Razumny within a week, but her speed had to be reduced to  due to vibrations from a bent propeller shaft. Resuming the journey, the expedition entered the Chukchi Sea, where on 17 August Razyaryonny became trapped between ice floes, needing to be extricated by the icebreakers Mikoyan and Kaganovich. She was towed by Baku for most of the way from Ambarchik to Dikson, where her left screw was replaced and right screw removed. With only one screw the destroyer was still able to make . After the expedition reached Kola Bay on 14 October, Razyaryonny was placed in a floating dock at Cape Abram-Karg, where she was repaired by the beginning of 1943.

Razyaryonny made her first sortie on 2 January 1943, rendezvousing with Allied transports. During this mission, she escaped damage from her stem touching the seafloor while approaching Salny Island in fog. Six days later, however, the destroyer ran aground on Salny Island en route to Vaenga after a power failure temporarily disabled steering. She managed to return to Murmansk under her own power, but a bent bow forced her to put in for repairs, which lasted until 25 June. As a result of this incident, her captain, Kapitan-leytenant Nikolay Nikolsky, was stripped of his rank and sent to a penal battalion, resuming his rank after being wounded; Nikolsky went on to command Razumny and two other destroyers before the end of the war.

During the second half of 1943 and 1944, Razyaryonny served on convoy escort and patrol duty, escorting 40 convoys between August 1943 and January 1945. With a detachment of ships, she searched for German warships as far as Berlevåg in far northern Norway on 26 October, and finding none, shelled Vardø during the Petsamo–Kirkenes Offensive. Norwegian fishing boat Spurven was sunk at Vardo. While escorting Convoy KP-1 to Liinakhamari with Razumny on 23 January 1945, the destroyer discovered the German submarine  with her sonar at 12:20. The two destroyers began hunting the submarine, which struck the stern of Razyaryonny with a GNAT torpedo at 12:50. Her stern was almost torn off and a fire broke out; the explosion killed 38 crew members and wounded 17. Initial attempts to tow her failed due to the condition of the stern, which caused the tow rope to snap. The stern fell off around 20:00 and the destroyer was towed back to Pechenga and thence to Murmansk. Repairs were completed postwar in 1946 at SRZ-25 in Rosta, Murmansk, with the salvaged stern of her sunken sister  being attached.

Razyaryonny became part of the White Sea Flotilla on 1 March 1954, but was removed from the combat fleet on 17 February 1956 before being reclassified as the test ship OS-4 ten days later. The former destroyer participated in nuclear tests on 7 September and 10 October 1957, being sunk in Chyornaya bay of Novaya Zemlya during the latter. She was struck from the Soviet Navy on 1 March 1958.

Citations

Sources

Further reading
 

Gnevny-class destroyers
1941 ships
Ships built at the Black Sea Shipyard
Cold War destroyers of the Soviet Union